Charles Richard-Hamelin (born 17 July 1989) is a Canadian concert pianist from Joliette, Quebec.

Early life and education

Richard-Hamelin was born in Lanaudière, Quebec, Canada, and took his first piano lessons with his father. He studied at McGill University, where he received his bachelor's degree in 2011. Richard-Hamelin completed his master's degree at Yale School of Music in 2013.

Career

In 2014, he won second prize at the Montreal International Musical Competition and third prize at the Seoul International Music Competition in South Korea. The following year, he participated in the XVII International Chopin Piano Competition (Warsaw, 2015), where he received the silver medal and the Krystian Zimerman Prize for the best performance of a Sonata. He also received the most prize money in the Competition. 

Following the competition Richard-Hamelin toured across Canada mainly performing works by Chopin. The Fryderyk Chopin Institute later released a two-disc album of his audition performances for the competition.  He also completed three concert tours in Japan. 

In 2016 he was the receipient of the Choquette-Symcox Award conferred by JM Canada Foundation and Jeunesses Musicales Canada, was accompanied by a $5,000 excellence scholarship. and participated in a Jeunesses Musicales Canada tour in Quebec and Ontario.

In 2018 Richard-Hamelin and Andrew Wan released an album, Beethoven: Violin Sonatas Nos. 6, 7 & 8; in 2019 the album was nominated for a Juno Award as Classical album of the year. In February 2019 he gave a solo performance at Koerner Hall in Toronto; the performance was recorded by CBC Radio 2.

References

External links 
 

Canadian classical pianists
Male classical pianists
1989 births
Living people
Prize-winners of the International Chopin Piano Competition
Félix Award winners